USS Embattle (AM-226) was an  built for the United States Navy during World War II. She earned two battle stars in service in the Pacific during World War II. In May 1946, she was turned over to the Republic of China for service with the Chinese Maritime Customs Service as Yung Hsing. Her fate is unreported in secondary sources.

Career 
Embattle was launched 17 September 1944 by American Shipbuilding Co., Lorain, Ohio; and commissioned 25 April 1945.

Embattle sailed from Cleveland, Ohio, 30 April 1945 via the St. Lawrence Waterway and after voyage repairs at Boston, Massachusetts, and shakedown exercises at Norfolk, Virginia, was en route to the Pacific when the war ended. After calling at San Pedro, California, she continued to Okinawa, arriving 6 November to aid in the postwar minesweeping operations there and in Japanese waters.

Reporting to Subic Bay, Philippine Islands, 21 March 1946, she was demilitarized and departed for Shanghai, China. She was decommissioned there 29 May 1946, and turned over on the same day to the Chinese Maritime Commission via the Foreign Liquidation Commission of the State Department. She was renamed Yung Hsing (A 7). Her fate is unknown.

Embattle received one battle star for World War II service.

References 
 
 NavSource Online: Mine Warfare Vessel Photo Archive - Embattle (AM 226)

Admirable-class minesweepers
Ships built in Lorain, Ohio
1944 ships
World War II minesweepers of the United States

Yung Hsing